Laiuse Castle (Estonian: Laiuse ordulinnus, German: Burg Lais) was a Livonian Order castle in Laiusevälja, Jõgeva Parish, Estonia. The castle is now in ruins.

Laiuse Castle was the first castle in Estonia built to cope with firearms. The oldest part of the castle was probably built in the end of 14th century by the Livonian Order. It was first mentioned in 1406. In 1558 during the Livonian War the castle was conquered by Russian troops and badly damaged. Nonetheless, the castle was later still in use both by Polish and Swedish rulers. During the Great Northern War, from 1700 to 1701, after the Battle of Narva, the Swedish king Charles XII established his winter quarters here. For five months Laiuse was the administrative center of Swedish Empire.

See also
 List of castles in Estonia

External links

Gallery

External links

Castles in Estonia
Castles of the Livonian Order
Buildings and structures in Jõgeva County
Jõgeva Parish
Ruined castles in Estonia
Tourist attractions in Jõgeva County